Daniel Wilhelm Magnusson (born 8 March 2000) is a Swedish curler.

Teams

Men's

Mixed doubles

Private life
Daniel Magnusson started curling in 2008, when he was 8 years old.

He resides in Karlstad. He attended Linnaeus University.

References

External links

Magnusson, Daniel | Nordic Junior Curling Tour

Living people
2000 births
Sportspeople from Karlstad
Swedish male curlers
World curling champions
Curlers at the 2022 Winter Olympics
Medalists at the 2022 Winter Olympics
Olympic medalists in curling
Olympic gold medalists for Sweden
Olympic curlers of Sweden
Competitors at the 2023 Winter World University Games
21st-century Swedish people

Linnaeus University alumni